Barbara Roxana Wezorke (born 12 April 1993 Flörsheim) is a German volleyball player.

Career 

She participated in the 2017 Montreux Volley Masters, 2017 FIVB Volleyball World Grand Prix, and the 2018 FIVB Volleyball Women's Nations League.

References

External links 
 FIVB profile
 DREI NEUE ROTE RABEN: ACOSTA, SIMS UND WEZORKE
 http://www.fivb.org/vis_web/volley/WGP2017b/WGP2017b_p2-040.pdf
 http://www.fivb.org/vis_web/volley/WGP2017b/WGP2017b_p2-021.pdf

1993 births
Living people
German women's volleyball players
People from Main-Taunus-Kreis
Sportspeople from Darmstadt (region)